Christ I (also known as Christ A or (The) Advent Lyrics), is a fragmentary collection of Old English poems on the coming of the Lord, preserved in the Exeter Book. In its present state, the poem comprises 439 lines in twelve distinct sections. In the assessment of Edward B. Irving Jr, "two masterpieces stand out of the mass of Anglo-Saxon religious poetry: The Dream of the Rood and the sequence of liturgical lyrics in the Exeter Book ... known as Christ I".

The topic of the poem is Advent, the time period in the annual liturgical cycle leading up to the anniversary of the coming of Christ, a period of great spiritual and symbolic significance within the Church — for some in early medieval Europe a time of fasting, and the subject of a sermon by Gregory the Great (590-604 CE). The Old English lyrics of Christ I, playing off the Latin antiphons, reflect on this period of symbolic preparation.

Manuscript and associated texts
Christ I is found on folios 8r-14r of the Exeter Book, a collection of Old English poetry today containing 123 folios. The collection also contains a number of other religious and allegorical poems. Some folios have been lost at the start of the poem, meaning that an indeterminate amount of the original composition is missing.

Christ I, concerning the Advent of Jesus, is followed in the Exeter Book by a poem on Jesus's Ascension composed by Cynewulf, generally known in modern scholarship as Christ II, which in turn is followed by Christ III, on the Last Judgment. Together these three poems comprise a total of 1664 lines, and are in turn linked to the poems that follow, Guthlac A and Guthlac B. The sequence of Christ I-III is sometimes known simply as Christ, and has at times been thought to be one poem completed by a single author. Linguistic and stylistic differences indicate, however, that Christ I-III originated as separate compositions (perhaps with Christ II being composed as a bridge between Christ I and Christ III). Nevertheless, Christ I-III stands as an artistically coherent compilation.

The text also contains glosses by Laurence Nowell from the sixteenth century or George Hickes from the seventeenth.

Origins 
Because Christ II is signed by Cynewulf, earlier scholarship supposed that Christ I might also be his work; but recent research agrees that the authorship is unknown. Claes Schaar suggested that the poem may have been written between the end of the eighth century and the beginning of the ninth.

Sample 
The following passage describes the Advent of Christ and is a modern English translation of Lyric 5 (lines 104-29 in the numbering of the Anglo-Saxon Poetic Records):

Sources and structure 
As presented in the Exeter Book, Christ I is divided into five sections, each marked by a large capital, a line-break, and punctuation, as follows: lines 1-70, 71-163, 164-272, 275-377, 378-439.

However, researchers have found it helpful to understand Christ I as comprising twelve sections or 'lyrics'. Each lyric is introduced with a selection from a Latin antiphon (verses from Scripture sung before and after the reading of a psalm chosen to reflect the fundamental ideas presented in the psalm), followed by lines of poetry in Old English which expand on that source. Most of the antiphons used are known as the O Antiphons, which receive their name because they all begin with the Latin interjection O (rendered in the poem with the Old English interjection ēalā). Medieval manuscripts of the O Antiphons vary in order and content, meaning that the precise sources for several of the Christ I lyrics are uncertain.

Several of the Greater Antiphons are not used in Christ I, leading some scholars speculate that, since we know that the beginning of Christ I is missing, the missing antiphons ("O Sapientia", "O Adonai", and "O radix Jesse") were originally used in the poem but have been lost.

The following table summarises the content and sources of each of the twelve lyrics. Unless otherwise stated, information on sources comes from Burgert and the antiphon text from Bamberg State Library, MS Misc. Patr. 17/B.11.10, folios 133-62, 10c.

Interpretation of structure 
The order of antiphons that the author uses for the lyrics imply that the poet was not concerned about any distinctions between antiphons, or the order that he had found them in his sources. Upon analysis of the position of each poem, no rational order can be found, suggesting that the order of each poem in the sequence is unimportant.

Influence on other writers

J.R.R. Tolkien was influenced by the following lines from Christ I (lines 104-5), which inspired his portrayal the character Eärendil in his legendarium and is one of many examples of the Old English word middangeard which partly inspired Tolkien's fantasy world:

Tolkien wrote "There was something very remote and strange and beautiful behind those words, if I could grasp it, far beyond ancient English."

Editions and translations

Editions 
 , pp. 3-49; online at the Oxford Text Archive
 The Advent Lyrics of the Exeter Book, ed. by Jackson J. Campbell (Princeton: Princeton University Press, 1959)
 The Old English Advent a Typological Commentary, ed. by R. B. Burlin, Yale Studies in English, 168 (New Haven, CT, 1968)

Translations 

 The Christ of Cynewulf, A Poem in Three Parts: The Advent, the Ascension, and the Last Judgement, trans. by Charles Huntington Whitman (Boston: Ginn, 1900)
 Cynewulf, Christ, trans. by Charles W. Kennedy (Cambridge, Ontario: In Parentheses, 2000)

Notes

References

External links 

Old English poems